Runo Isaksen (born 23 July 1968 in Lyngen) is a Norwegian writer. He works as a journalist at the University of Bergen.

Bibliography
Open book - novel (1997) 
Ren - novel (1998) 
Gloria - novel (2002) 
Stylitten - (2004) 
Literature in war - Nonfiction (2005) 
A perfect day - novel (2009) 
Someone has finally found me - novel (2013)

Pricing
Aschehougs debutant Scholarship 1997 for Open book

References 
 Presentation of Runo Isaksen Author catalog on Author Sentrums sites

Norwegian male novelists
1968 births
People from Lyngen
Living people
20th-century Norwegian novelists
21st-century Norwegian novelists
Norwegian journalists